Dominique Peyroux (born 21 January 1989) is a professional rugby league footballer who plays as a  forward or  for Toulouse Olympique in the Betfred Championship. He has played for the Cook Islands and Samoa at international level.

He previously played for the Gold Coast Titans and the New Zealand Warriors in the NRL, and St Helens in the Super League. Peyroux represented the Cook Islands at the 2009 Pacific Cup, 2013 World Cup and the 2021 World Cup, and Samoa at the 2014 Four Nations.

Early years
Peyroux was born in Auckland, New Zealand to a father of Cook Island and French descent and a mother of Samoan and Solomon Island descent.

He played junior rugby league for the Otahuhu Leopards, Mangere East Hawks, and Papatoetoe Panthers. He attended and played for the Sarah Redfern High School after moving to Australia with his family at age 15 to pursue his rugby league career. Peyroux signed with the Sydney Roosters, and then moved to Mattraville Sports High School in his final year of schooling, winning the AAC National Champions Trophy with the school in 2007.

Playing career

Peyroux signed professionally for the Sydney Roosters in 2007 but never featured for their first grade side, instead playing in the National Youth Competition in the Under 20 set-up. He then featured for Sydney's feeder side, the Newtown Jets, in the New South Wales Cup for the 2008 season, before joining the Gold Coast Titans. In 2010, he was dual registered with Tweed Heads Seagulls, a feeder club to the Titans.

He made his debut for the Titans in 2011 and played sixteen games for the club as they finished last on the table and claimed the wooden spoon.

Peyroux joined the New Zealand Warriors for the 2013 season and made his debut for the club on 3 June 2013.

He signed for St Helens, and started on a two-year contract at the beginning of 2016 season.

He played in the 2019 Challenge Cup Final defeat by the Warrington Wolves at Wembley Stadium.

He played in the 2019 Super League Grand Final victory over the Salford Red Devils at Old Trafford.

On 17 Nov 2020 it was announced that Peyroux would be joining his teammate Joseph Paulo at Toulouse Olympique for the 2021 season

He played in St Helens 8-4 2020 Super League Grand Final victory over Wigan at the Kingston Communications Stadium in Hull.

Toulouse Olympique 
On 17 November 2020, Toulouse announced the signing of Peyroux from St Helens on a two-year deal.
On 10 October 2021, Peyroux played for Toulouse in their victory over Featherstone in the Million Pound Game which saw the club promoted to the Super League for the first time in their history.

Representative career
This win guided them to the final against Papua New Guinea on 1 November 2009. They lost this final by 42–14, a game in which Peyroux scored his third try in as many games in the tournament.

In October and November 2013, Peyroux played for 'the Kukis' in their 2013 Rugby League World Cup campaign. He scored a try in 2 of their 3 games in the tournament.

In May 2014, Peyroux played for another Pacific Island Nation. He represented Samoa in the 2014 Pacific Rugby League International.

On 7 October 2014, Peyroux was selected in the Samoan 24-man squad for the 2014 Four Nations series. He was only used once in the campaign.

On 2 May 2015, Peyroux scored the winning try after a line-break in their Polynesian Cup match against Tonga.

Personal life
Whilst playing for the Roosters in 2008, Peyroux featured in the Naked for a Cause initiative Gods of Football in which AFL and ARL players compiled a nude calendar to raise money for breast cancer charity the McGrath Foundation.

References

External links

St Helens profile
New Zealand Warriors profile
SL profile
Saints Heritage Society profile

1989 births
Living people
People educated at Matraville Sports High School
Cook Islands national rugby league team players
Gold Coast Titans players
Mangere East Hawks players
New Zealand rugby league players
New Zealand people of French descent
New Zealand sportspeople of Samoan descent
New Zealand people of Solomon Islands descent
New Zealand sportspeople of Cook Island descent
New Zealand Warriors players
Newtown Jets NSW Cup players
Otahuhu Leopards players
Papatoetoe Panthers players
Rugby league centres
Rugby league players from Auckland
Rugby league second-rows
Rugby league wingers
Samoa national rugby league team players
St Helens R.F.C. players
Toulouse Olympique players
Tweed Heads Seagulls players